The Easiest Way is a 1917 American silent film starring Clara Kimball Young and directed by Albert Capellani. It is based on a 1909 play, The Easiest Way by Eugene Walter, staged by David Belasco and starred Frances Starr as Laura Murdock. Belasco and Starr revived the play in 1921. It is not known whether the film currently survives.

Actor Joseph Kilgour reprises his role as Brockton from the Broadway play.

Plot summary

Cast
 Clara Kimball Young - Laura Murdock
 Louise Bates - Elfie St. Clair
 Joseph Kilgour - Willard Brockton
 Rockliffe Fellowes - John Madison
 Cleo Desmond - Annie
 George Stevens - Jim Weston
 Frank Kingdon - Burgess
 Mae Hopkins - Nellie De Vere
 Walter McEwen - Jerry

References

External links
 
 
 
 

1917 films
American silent feature films
American films based on plays
Films directed by Albert Capellani
American romantic drama films
American black-and-white films
1917 romantic drama films
Selznick Pictures films
1910s American films
Silent romantic drama films
Silent American drama films